Amphotis marginata is a nitidulid beetle.

Description 
The beetles are between 3.8-5.8mm in size.

Symbiotic relationship 
Beetles of the species Amphotis marginata have a symbiotic relationship with ants, specifically Lasius fuliginosus. Adults primarily rely on these ants for their nutrition. They are able to get the ants to release the harvested food by mimicking the food-begging signals used between ants on the foraging trails.

Range
Occurrences registered through the sources aggregated by GBIF, suggests that Amphotis marginata exists mainly in Europe. Occurrences have been registered from the south of Scandinavia to the north of Spain.

Habitat
Due to the symbiotic relationship with Lasius fuliginosus, Amphotis marginata has a habitat close to the foraging paths of these ants.

References

Nitidulidae